Szajol is a village in Jász-Nagykun-Szolnok county, in the Northern Great Plain region of central Hungary.

It is known for the 1994 railway disaster at Szajol station, killing 31 people and injuring 52 more.

Geography

References

External links
 Official site in Hungarian

Populated places in Jász-Nagykun-Szolnok County